Tramore is a seaside town in County Waterford, on the southeast coast of Ireland. With humble origins as a small fishing village, the area saw rapid development upon the arrival of the railway from Waterford City in 1853. Initially, the town flourished as a tourist destination, attracting visitors from as far away as Dublin in summer and from closer to home all year-round. As the population grew steadily in the latter part of the 20th century, Tramore became a satellite and dormitory town of Waterford City, situated some 13 km to the north. Today the town is a popular destination for surfing and other water sports due to its large, sheltered bay and provision of accommodation and amenities.

History

The Sea Horse tragedy

On 30 January 1816, the transport ship Sea Horse foundered in Tramore Bay with the 2nd battalion of the 59th Regiment of Foot on board. 292 men and 71 women and children perished. A monument to the incident is located on Doneraile Walk and an obelisk marks a burial plot at Christ Church on Church Road. 

The town's connection to the tragedy led to the image of a seahorse being adopted as a symbol of the town of Tramore and later adopted as the logo for Waterford Crystal in 1955.

The Metal Man

From the sea, the sheltered yet treacherous Tramore Bay can be easily confused with the traditional safe haven of the Suir estuary. After the sinking of the Sea Horse, its insurers Lloyd's of London funded the building of piers and the erection of pillars on two headlands as a visual aid to prevent similar calamities from happening. The pillars, three on Newtown Head and two on Brownstown Head, were erected in 1823.

"The Metal Man" is a 3-metre tall cast-metal figure of a sailor pointing seawards, set atop the central pillar on Newtown Head. According to local lore, he is said to warn seafarers away from dangerous shallow waters by calling out "keep off, keep off, good ship from me, for I am the rock of misery".

Many myths and legends surround the Metal Man. It is reputed that a woman who hops backwards on one bare foot around the base of his pillar three times will be married within the year.

The Guillamene 
The Newtown and Guillamene swimming coves are located just off Cliff Road at the base of Newtown Head. Until the early 1980s, the Guillamene was a men-only swimming cove. Women and children were expected to bathe at Newtown. The "men-only" sign has been preserved as a reminder of times past, but today both coves are popular with swimmers of all genders and ages.

The Waterford and Tramore Railway 

Before the late 18th century, Tramore was a small fishing hamlet. Thereafter its potential was realised as "a pleasant retreat for the citizens of Waterford and others who assembled there for the benefit of the saltwater". A tourism boom has left a legacy of buildings dating from the 1860s such as the terraced housing on Strand Street. Opened in 1853, a 12 km (7 mi)-long railway line ran from Waterford's Railway Square to the terminus in Tramore. It was unique in that it was not connected to any other line. Tramore railway station opened on 5 September 1853 and finally closed on 1 January 1961.

The Pickardstown ambush

On the night of 6 June 1921, during the Irish War of Independence, 50 local IRA Volunteers attempted to ambush a party of 40 British troops from Waterford City, who were coming to Tramore following an attack on the RIC barracks there. The ambush took place at Pickardstown, about a mile to the north of Tramore. The ambush failed to go according to plan as they could not  see in the dark field. This caused the death of two IRA men and two wounded. Tramore's Micheál MacCraith GAA Club is named after one of the dead Volunteers.

Geography
The town is situated on the north-western corner of Tramore Bay on a hill that slopes down to the strand, or sand spit, that divides the bay. Behind the spit lies the tidal lagoon known as the "Backstrand". Holy Cross Church is an imposing Gothic Revival Catholic church, dominated by an asymmetrical tower and spire, situated on a monumental site overlooking the town. It was built between 1856 and 1871 by J. J. McCarthy. Tramore's sand dunes and back strand were designated a Special Area of Conservation by the National Parks & Wildlife Service, with Tramore Eco Group working to advance the conservation and protection of this areas ecological environment and wildlife habitats.

Archaeology
The area within a 16 km (10 mi) radius of Tramore is rich in megalithic structures including  Ballindud Cromlech, Ballynageeragh Portal Tomb, Knockeen Dolmen and Gaulstown Portal Tomb, signifying habitation long before Christianity.

Tourism

The town has long been associated with Irish tourists and offered a traditional seaside experience of ice cream, fairground and sand. The beachfront features a long promenade and an amusement park. It is a popular resort for tourists in the summer and has 5 km (3 mi) of beach and sand dunes looking out onto the Atlantic Ocean. There is a lot of accommodation for tourists, including hotels,  apartments, homes and caravan sites. Tramore has a reputation for surfing.

The Promenade, erected in 1914, serves as a popular tourist spot in Tramore and is the focus of the attractions of the strand during the summer. The Cliff Road was built in 1872 as a carriageway on the site of an old Coastguard path and provides access to Newtown Head and the men's swimming club.

Waterford and Tramore Racecourse
Tramore is known for a horse-racing festival that has been held every August for more than 200 years. The horses used to run along the strand, the route later moved to a purpose-built racecourse. Soon after the railway arrived, Lord Doneraile and James Delahunty built a racecourse at Riverstown. Racing continued here until 1911 when the area finally succumbed to the sea, and, at low tide, one can still see part of the racecourse from the back strand.

Tramore Racecourse was built at Graun Hill in 1912. The course has been developed and improved and is regularly used as a venue for shows and music events.

Walks
The scenic landscape of Tramore, represented by the strand and cliffs, attracts many walkers.  Walks in the locality include the Doneraile Walk, Cliff Road Walk, as well as the 5 km Strand walk commonly called 'down the back and up the front'. Another attraction between March and September every year is the set up of "The Amusements" a small amusement park with a selection of rides and other attractions opposite the beach.
Otherwise known as "down-around" by the locals

Surfing

Tramore has become renowned as a surfing location in Ireland, as well as other watersports including kitesurfing and windsurfing. The sport was first brought to the town in 1967 by Irish surfing pioneer Kevin Cavey. Tramore has many surf stores, board manufacturers, surf schools and hire shops in the town. There are many good breaks in and around Tramore. During big swell and wind locals also head to surf Killmurren Cove where there is some shelter and other breaks nearby often work when Tramore is blown out with big swell including Dunmore East, Bunmahon and Annestown.

People 
 Louise Richardson, political scientist, former Vice-Chancellor of Oxford University, was born here
 Shay Brennan, footballer for Manchester United, died here
 John Edward Carew, sculptor, was born here 
 Mary D. Cullen, born 1929, was educated here
 Jim Goodwin, football player and manager, was born here
 Gordon MacWhinnie, businessman in Hong Kong, was born here 
 George Morrison, documentary filmmaker, was born here
 Edward J. Phelan, civil servant, first Director-General of the International Labour Organisation, was born here
 Derrick Williams (footballer), footballer for LA Galaxy

See also
 Celtworld
 List of towns and villages in Ireland
 List of RNLI stations
 Pickardstown ambush
 Surfing in Ireland
 Thalatta! Thalatta! (similar to Tramore's motto)

References

External links

Towns and villages in County Waterford
Beaches of County Waterford
Surfing locations in Ireland